André Groult (27 August 1884 – 1966) was a French decorator and furniture designer., and one of the most prominent figures of the Art Deco style. His work featured curving and organic shapes, and extremely rich materials.  His work has been described as compromising between tradition and modernism. For the Exposition Internationale des Arts Décoratifs et Industriels Modernes in 1925, he designed a woman's bedchamber with a pink and gray palette. The room featured tended walls of Soie stitching. The furniture in the room was rounded and covered in natural Galuchat.

In 1935, Groult designed the furnishings of the first-class cabins on the ocean liner SS Normandie.

External links 
 Mobilier national

References

1884 births
French furniture designers
Art Deco artists
1966 deaths
Place of birth missing
Place of death missing
Date of death missing
French cabinetmakers